Iosif Rotariu (born 27 September 1962) is a retired Romanian association football midfielder. He debuted in Divizia A with FC Politehnica Timișoara in 1981. He won the league championship with Steaua București in 1987, 1988, 1989, 1997 and 1998, and won the Romanian Cup with the same club in 1987, 1988, 1989 and 1997. He also played abroad, in Turkey.

Rotariu made his debut for the Romania national team in 1988 against Netherlands, and represented his country at the 1990 FIFA World Cup. He got 25 caps in total, the last in 1997, and scored one international goal, against Poland in 1990.

International career

International stats

International goals

Personal life
Rotariu's identical twin brother Ilie and his nephew Dorin also played professional football, but only Dorin managed to represent Romania at International level.

Honours

Player
Politehnica Timișoara
Romanian Cup: Runner-up: 1982–83
Divizia B: 1983–84

Steaua București
Divizia A: 1986–87, 1987–88, 1988–89, 1996–97, 1997–98
Romanian Cup: 1986–87, 1988–89, 1996–97
European Cup: Runner-up: 1988–89

Galatasaray
Süper Lig: Runner-up: 1990–91
Turkish Cup: 1990–91
Turkish Super Cup: 1991

Extensiv Craiova
Divizia B: 1998–99

Manager
FC Caransebeș
Liga III: 2013–14

References

External links

 
 

1962 births
Living people
Romanian footballers
Romania international footballers
1990 FIFA World Cup players
Romanian expatriate footballers
Association football midfielders
FC Politehnica Timișoara players
FC Steaua București players
FC CFR Timișoara players
SSU Politehnica Timișoara players
Liga I players
Galatasaray S.K. footballers
Bakırköyspor footballers
Süper Lig players
Expatriate footballers in Turkey
FC Bihor Oradea players
Romanian football managers
FC Politehnica Timișoara managers
FC Bihor Oradea managers